Richard Russell (born 8 September 1945) is a Jamaican former professional tennis player.

Biography
A national champion at the age of 16, Russell represented the Caribbean/West Indies in Davis Cup competition. He was the team's most successful player during its existence, winning a record ten rubbers between 1964 to 1976, eight of those in singles. In the 1966 Davis Cup competition he won the deciding fifth rubber over Venezuela's Isaías Pimentel to give the Caribbean/West Indies their first ever win in a tie and also won a doubles match against the American duo of Arthur Ashe and Charlie Passarel. In 1972 he won a singles rubber against Erik van Dillen of the United States.

Russell is the only Jamaican to progress past the first round at all four grand slam tournaments. At the 1966 Australian Championships he won his first round match over Richie Chopra, 6-0, 6-0, 6-0. Outside of grand slam competition, he had a noted win over Dennis Ralston in 1972 at an invitational tournament in Puerto Rico. In 1975 he took part in the inaugural Nations Cup (then the name of the World Team Cup), as a member of the Caribbean team.

His son Ryan played Davis Cup for Jamaica.

References

External links
 
 
 

1945 births
Living people
Jamaican male tennis players
Sportspeople from Kingston, Jamaica
Tennis players at the 1967 Pan American Games
Pan American Games competitors for Jamaica